College Park Industries is a prosthetics manufacturer headquartered in Warren, Michigan. The company was founded in 1988 after a local machinist set out to create the world's most anatomically correct prosthetic foot.

College Park's first product was the Trustep® foot, which mimics the anatomical movement of a foot by replicating the bones and tendons through composites, bumpers and bushings. Since the release of the Trustep®, College Park has gone on to design and develop many other innovative prosthetic feet that utilize their proprietary Intelliweave™ composites. These include the  Truper®, the first multi-axial pediatric foot; the  Soleus®, which was the first to incorporate Integrated Spring Technology (iST™); the heel-height adjustable  Accent® foot; and the  Odyssey® K2 & Odyssey® K3 feet which have a patented curved hydraulic ankle. College Park also manufacturers other prosthetic products, including endoskeleton components, liners, and sleeves. The company is ISO 13485 certified and sells its products worldwide. In 2015, College Park acquired  Liberating Technologies, Inc., an upper-limb prosthetics company.

References

External links

Espire Elbow
Anatomical Trustep Movement
Marine Vet Aims for 2018 Paralympic Winter Games
College Park Case Study
Designing replacements for human limbs
Clinical Prescription and Use of Prosthetic Foot and Ankle Mechanisms: A Review of the Literature

Companies based in Michigan
Companies established in 1988